Kebede Sahilu (born 9 December 1955) is an Ethiopian boxer. He competed in the men's welterweight event at the 1980 Summer Olympics.

References

External links
 

1955 births
Living people
Ethiopian male boxers
Olympic boxers of Ethiopia
Boxers at the 1980 Summer Olympics
Place of birth missing (living people)
Welterweight boxers